The 2015 AFC Asian Cup was an international football tournament that was held in Australia from 9 to 31 January 2015. The 16 national teams involved in the tournament were required to register a squad of 23 players, including three goalkeepers. Only players in these squads were eligible to take part in the tournament.

Before announcing their final squad, several teams named a provisional squad of 23 to 30 players, but each country's final squad of 23 players had to be submitted by 30 December 2014. Replacement of injured players was permitted until six hours before the team's first Asian Cup game. Players marked (c) were named as captain for their national squad. Number of caps counts until the start of the tournament, including all FIFA-recognized pre-tournament friendlies. Player's age is their age on the opening day of the tournament.

Group A

Australia 
Coach: Ange Postecoglou

On 7 December 2014, Postecoglou named a provisional list of 46 players for the tournament. The final squad was announced on 23 December 2014.

South Korea 
Coach:  Uli Stielike

The final squad was announced on 22 December 2014.

Oman 
Coach:  Paul Le Guen

The final squad was announced on 25 December 2014. There were two changes in the final squad: Sulaiman Al-Buraiki replaced Mohannad Al-Zaabi and Amer Said Al-Shatri replaced Saad Al-Mukhaini.

Kuwait 
Coach:  Nabil Maâloul

The final squad was announced on 30 December 2014.

Group B

Uzbekistan 
Coach: Mirjalol Qosimov

The final squad was announced on 30 December 2014.

Saudi Arabia 
Coach:  Cosmin Olăroiu

The final squad was announced on 25 December 2014. Nasser Al-Shamrani was ruled out for the tournament due to injury and replaced by Ibrahim Ghaleb.

China PR 
Coach:  Alain Perrin

The final squad was announced on 24 December 2014.

North Korea 
Coach: Jo Tong-sop

The final squad was announced on 30 December 2014.

Group C

Iran 
Coach:  Carlos Queiroz

The final squad was announced on 30 December 2014. On 7 January 2015, Hashem Beikzadeh was replaced by Mohammad Reza Khanzadeh due to injury.

United Arab Emirates 
Coach: Mahdi Ali

The final squad was announced on 27 December 2014. Mohamed Fawzi was ruled out for the tournament due to injury and replaced by Salem Saleh.

Qatar 
Coach:  Djamel Belmadi

The final squad was announced on 23 December 2014.

Bahrain 
Coach: Marjan Eid

The final squad was announced on 30 December 2014.

Group D

Japan 
Coach:  Javier Aguirre

The final squad was announced on 15 December 2014. However, defender Atsuto Uchida sustained injury afterwards and was replaced by Naomichi Ueda.

Jordan 
Coach:  Ray Wilkins

The final squad was announced on 18 December 2014.

Iraq 
Coach: Radhi Shenaishil

The final squad was announced on 29 December 2014.

Palestine 
Coach: Ahmed Al Hassan

The final squad was announced on 25 December 2014.

Player representation

By age

Players
Oldest:  Tim Cahill
Youngest:  Humam Tariq

Goalkeepers
Oldest:  Ramzi Saleh
Youngest:  Mohammed Hameed

Captains
Oldest:  Saud Kariri
Youngest:  Ki Sung-yueng

By club
Clubs with 5 or more players represented are listed.

By club nationality

† Including Nathan Burns who played for Wellington Phoenix, a New Zealand club competing in the A-League.

† Including Ki Sung-yueng who played for Swansea City, a Wales club competing in the Premier League.

† Including Pak Kwang-ryong who played for FC Vaduz, a Liechtenstein club competing in the Swiss Super League.

By club federation

† Including Nathan Burns who played for Wellington Phoenix, a New Zealand club competing in the A-League. All other New Zealand clubs are members of the OFC.

By representatives of domestic league

† Including Nathan Burns who played for Wellington Phoenix, a New Zealand club competing in the A-League.

References 

Squads
AFC Asian Cup squads